Zhang Ping or Ping Zhang may refers to:

 Zhang Ping (Sixteen Kingdoms) (died 361), warlord during the Sixteen Kingdoms period
 Zhang Ping (politician) (born 1946), Chinese politician
 Zhang Ping (writer) (born 1953), Chinese novelist
 Zhang Ping (engineer)  (born 1959), Chinese engineer
 Zhang Ping (volleyball) (born 1982), Chinese volleyball player
 Ping Zhang (information scientist)
 Ping Zhang (graph theorist)
 Ping Zhang (biologist)